John Wynn Fredericks (July 18, 1899 – January 28, 1981) was an American college football player and coach. He served as the head football coach at Lock Haven University of Pennsylvania in 1924.

References

External links
 

1899 births
1981 deaths
Lock Haven Bald Eagles football coaches
Yale Bulldogs football players
The Hill School faculty
High school football coaches in Pennsylvania
People from Lock Haven, Pennsylvania
Players of American football from Pennsylvania
Educators from Pennsylvania